Betsy Branch is a stream in Lewis County in the U.S. state of Missouri. It is a tributary of the Middle Fabius River.

The namesake of Betsy Branch has been lost to history.

See also
List of rivers of Missouri

References

Rivers of Lewis County, Missouri
Rivers of Missouri